John Isner was the defending champion and successfully defended the title, defeating Dudi Sela in the final, 6–3, 6–4.

Seeds
The top four seeds receive a bye into the second round.

Draw

Finals

Top half

Bottom half

Qualifying

Seeds

 Thiemo de Bakker (qualifying competition, Lucky loser)
 Alex Kuznetsov (qualifying competition, Lucky loser)
 Rajeev Ram (qualifying competition, Lucky loser)
 John-Patrick Smith (qualified)
 Illya Marchenko (qualified)
 Steven Diez (qualified)
 Kevin King (qualifying competition)
 Michael Venus (qualified)

Qualifiers

Lucky losers

Qualifying draw

First qualifier

Second qualifier

Third qualifier

Fourth qualifier

References
Main draw
Qualifying draw

BBandT Atlanta Open - Singles
2014 Singles